Ali Rahimzade (Əli Rəhimzadə, born 23 November 1997) is an Azerbaijani freestyle wrestler. He is a two-time bronze medalist at the European Wrestling Championships.

Career 

At the 2018 World U23 Wrestling Championship held in Bucharest, Romania, he won the silver medal in the 65 kg event.

In 2020, he won one of the bronze medals in the 65 kg event at the European Wrestling Championships held in Rome, Italy. He repeated this in the same event at the 2021 European Wrestling Championships held in Warsaw, Poland.

Major results

References

External links 
 

Living people
1997 births
Place of birth missing (living people)
Azerbaijani male sport wrestlers
European Wrestling Championships medalists
21st-century Azerbaijani people